Saki Minemura (峯村沙紀 Minemura Saki, born April 18, 1990) is a Japanese volleyball player who plays for NEC Red Rockets.

Profiles
Her father was a teacher of physical education.
She became a volleyball player at the age of 7.
While attending Susobana junior high, the volleyball team won the top of Japanese junior high.
While attending Kyushubunka Gakuen high school, the volleyball team won the top of Japanese high school with Honami Tsukiji and Yukari Miyata.

Clubs 
 Nagano Municipal Susobana Junior High
 Kyushubunka high school
 Toray Arrows (2009–2017)
 NEC Red Rockets (2018–2020)

Awards

Team 
2008 The 14th Asian Junior Volleyball Championship -  Champion, with Junior national team
2009 Kurowashiki All Japan Volleyball Championship -  Champion, with Toray Arrows
2009-2010 V.Premier League -  Champion, with Toray Arrows
2010 Kurowashiki All Japan Volleyball Championship -  Champion, with Toray Arrows
2010-11 V.Premier League -  Runner-up, with Toray Arrows

National team

Junior team 
 Junior national team (2008–2009)

References

External links
JVA Biography
Toray Arrows Women's Volleyball Team

Japanese women's volleyball players
Living people
People from Nagano Prefecture
1990 births
Volleyball players at the 2010 Asian Games
Asian Games competitors for Japan